Alimuddin Daeng Matiro was the second regent of Poso Regency, Central Sulawesi, Indonesia; who ruled from 1954 to 1956. As well as the first regent of Poso, Abdul Latif Daeng Masikki, he also came from the military.

He was also one of the 51 people who declared Permesta, a rebel movement fighting against the Indonesian central government, along with Ventje Sumual and Alexander Evert Kawilarang.

References

Indonesian politicians
Indonesian military personnel
Regents of places in Indonesia